The Bezirk Suhl was a district (Bezirk) of East Germany. The administrative seat and the main town was Suhl.

History
The district was established, with the other 13, on 25 July 1952, substituting the old German states. After 3 October 1990 it was disestablished as a consequence of the German reunification, becoming again part of the state of Thuringia.

Geography

Position
The Bezirk Suhl, the westernmost and the smallest of the GDR, bordered with the Bezirke of Erfurt and Gera. It bordered also with West Germany.

Subdivision
The Bezirk was divided into 9 Kreise: 1 urban district (Stadtkreis) and 8 rural districts (Landkreise): 
Urban district : Suhl.
Rural districts : Bad Salzungen; Hildburghausen; Ilmenau; Meiningen; Neuhaus; Schmalkalden; Sonneberg; Suhl.

References

Suhl
Bezirk Suhl
Former states and territories of Thuringia
Suhl
South Thuringia